Alexander I, also known as Alexander "Philhellene" (Greek: φιλέλλην, literally "fond/lover of the Greeks", and in this context "Greek patriot"), was king of Macedonia from 497 BC until his death in 454 BC. He was succeeded by his eldest son, Perdiccas II.

Biography 

Alexander was the son of Amyntas I and an unknown mother. He had a sister named Gygaea.

According to Herodotus, Alexander married his sister to the Persian general Bubares while a vassal of the Achaemenid Empire as a bribe to cover up his murder of a Persian embassy. However, this story is widely regarded as a fiction invented by Herodotus or, at least, hearsay from his time spent in Macedonia. It is more likely that Amyntas arranged the marriage himself around 510, or that Alexander handled it after his father died. 

Alexander came to the throne during the era of the kingdom's vassalage to Achaemenid Persia, dating back to the time of his father, Amyntas I, although Macedon retained a broad scope of autonomy. In 492 BC it was made a fully subordinate part of the Persian Empire by Mardonius' campaign. Alexander acted as a representative of the Persian governor Mardonius during peace negotiations after the Persian defeat at the Battle of Salamis in 480 BC. In later events, Herodotus several times mentions Alexander as a man who was on Xerxes' side and followed his orders.

From the time of Mardonius' conquest of Macedon, Herodotus refers to Alexander as hyparchos, meaning viceroy. Despite his cooperation with Persia, Alexander frequently gave supplies and advice to the Greek city states, and warned them of Mardonius' plans before the Battle of Plataea in 479 BC. For example, Alexander warned the Greeks in Tempe to leave before the arrival of Xerxes' troops, and notified them of an alternate route into Thessaly through upper Macedonia. After their defeat in Plataea, the Persian army under the command of Artabazus tried to retreat all the way back to Asia Minor. Most of the 43,000 survivors were attacked and killed by the forces of Alexander at the estuary of the Strymon river. Alexander eventually regained Macedonian independence after the end of the Persian Wars. 

Alexander claimed descent from Argive Greeks and Heracles. After a court of Elean hellanodikai determined his claim to be true, he was permitted to participate in the Olympic Games possibly in 504 BC, a right reserved only for Greeks. He modelled his court after Athens and was a patron of the poets Pindar and Bacchylides, both of whom dedicated poems to Alexander. The earliest reference to an Athenian proxenos, who lived during the time of the Persian wars (c. 490 BC), is that of Alexander I. Alexander was given the title "philhellene" (Greek: "φιλέλλην", fond of the Greeks, lover of the Greeks), a title used for Greek patriots.

Family 
Alexander had five sons and a daughter:
 Perdiccas II, future king of Macedon. 
 Menelaus, father of Amyntas II
 Philip
 Amyntas, whose son Arrhidaeus was the father of Amyntas III. He was thought to be the father of Balacrus, father of Meleager and grandfather of Arsinoe of Macedon
Alcetas
 Stratonice, married by her brother Perdiccas II to Seuthes II of Thrace.

See also
Ancient Macedonians
List of ancient Macedonians

References

External links

6th-century BC births
454 BC deaths
5th-century BC Macedonian monarchs
Argead kings of Macedonia
Ancient Olympic competitors
Ancient Macedonian athletes
5th-century BC rulers
6th-century BC Macedonians
Proxenoi
Achaemenid Macedon
Battle of Plataea
Rulers in the Achaemenid Empire